Salem Township may refer to:

Arkansas
 Salem Township, Greene County, Arkansas, in Greene County, Arkansas
 Salem Township, Saline County, Arkansas, in Saline County, Arkansas

Illinois
 Salem Township, Carroll County, Illinois
 Salem Township, Knox County, Illinois
 Salem Township, Marion County, Illinois

Indiana
 Salem Township, Delaware County, Indiana
 Salem Township, Pulaski County, Indiana
 Salem Township, Steuben County, Indiana

Iowa
 Salem Township, Henry County, Iowa

Kansas
 Salem Township, Allen County, Kansas
 Salem Township, Cowley County, Kansas
 Salem Township, Greenwood County, Kansas
 Salem Township, Sedgwick County, Kansas

Michigan
 Salem Township, Allegan County, Michigan
 Salem Township, Washtenaw County, Michigan

Minnesota
 Salem Township, Cass County, Minnesota
 Salem Township, Olmsted County, Minnesota

Missouri
 Salem Township, Daviess County, Missouri
 Salem Township, Dunklin County, Missouri
 Salem Township, Lewis County, Missouri
 Salem Township, Perry County, Missouri

Nebraska
 Salem Township, Franklin County, Nebraska, in Franklin County, Nebraska

North Carolina
 Salem Township, Granville County, North Carolina, in Granville County, North Carolina
 Salem Township, Pasquotank County, North Carolina, in Pasquotank County, North Carolina

New Jersey
 Salem Township, Salem County, New Jersey, now the city of Salem

Ohio
 Salem Township, Auglaize County, Ohio
 Salem Township, Champaign County, Ohio
 Salem Township, Columbiana County, Ohio
 Salem Township, Highland County, Ohio
 Salem Township, Jefferson County, Ohio
 Salem Township, Meigs County, Ohio
 Salem Township, Monroe County, Ohio
 Salem Township, Muskingum County, Ohio 
 Salem Township, Ottawa County, Ohio
 Salem Township, Shelby County, Ohio
 Salem Township, Tuscarawas County, Ohio
 Salem Township, Warren County, Ohio
 Salem Township, Washington County, Ohio
 Salem Township, Wyandot County, Ohio

Pennsylvania
 Salem Township, Clarion County, Pennsylvania
 Salem Township, Luzerne County, Pennsylvania
 Salem Township, Mercer County, Pennsylvania
 Salem Township, Wayne County, Pennsylvania
 Salem Township, Westmoreland County, Pennsylvania

South Dakota
 Salem Township, McCook County, South Dakota, in McCook County, South Dakota
 Salem Township, Turner County, South Dakota, in Turner County, South Dakota

Township name disambiguation pages